Turanspor is a sports club in located in Ankara, Turkey. The football club played in the Bölgesel Amatör Lig before its' dissolution.

History 
The team was founded in 1947 under the name Şekerspor; It kept this name until 1958. In 2005, the club was bought by K&C Group, a construction company and the club transferred Sergen Yalçın.

In 2015 Club President Orhan Kapelman claimed that he has always been an "idealist", a name given to the members of the far-right Grey Wolves organization. The club stated that it will include only nationalist football players and coaches in its staff and changed its name to Turanspor, named after Turanism.

Turanspor withdrew from the Regional Amateur League in the 2015-2016 season.

After the club was removed from the Sugar Factory facilities, of which the club is a tenant, because it could not pay its debts, the club management could not find a place to stay and the club became history.

Notable Players 

  Sergen Yalçın

Previous names
 Şekerspor (1947–1958)
 Şeker Hilal (1958–1963)
 Şekerspor (1963–2005)
 Etimesgut Şekerspor (2005–2010)
 Beypazarı Şekerspor (2010–2012)
 Çamlıdere Şekerspor (2012–2013)
 Şekerspor (2013–2014)
 Tutap Şekerspor (2014–2015)
 Turanspor (2015–)

League participations

 Super League: 1959–63, 1964–66, 1967–69, 1972–73, 1997–98
 1st League: 1963–64, 1966–67, 1969–72, 1973–92, 1994–97, 1998–2003
 2nd League: 1992–94, 2003–2005, 2006–2013
 3r League: 2005–2006, 2013–15
 Regional Amateur League: 2015–2016
 Amateur League: 1947–59
 Ankara Regional Amateur League: 2016–17

References

External links
 
Şekerspor on TFF page 

Football clubs in Turkey
Association football clubs established in 1947
 
1947 establishments in Turkey
Etimesgut District
Süper Lig clubs